Antony II Kauleas, (died 1 February 901) was Patriarch of Constantinople from 893 to February 12, 901.

Life
A monk by age 12, Antony Kauleas became a priest and the abbot of an unnamed monastery.  He came to the attention of Stylianos Zaoutzes, the all-powerful minister of Emperor Leo VI. Antony had supported Leo against the former Patriarch Photios I of Constantinople, and had contributed to the pacification of the Church by effecting a compromise between the supporters of Photios and Ignatios.  The emperor appointed Antony patriarch after the death of his own brother, Patriarch Stephen I of Constantinople in 893.

Patriarch Antony II was a pious man who generously endowed monastic foundations and founded or re-founded the Kaulea monastery with the support of the emperor, who preached at the church's dedication.  Buried in the church of his monastery, Antony was held responsible for various miracles. He was canonized as a saint by both the Orthodox and Catholic Churches and he is commemorated on February 12.

See also
Eastern Orthodoxy

References
 The Oxford Dictionary of Byzantium, Oxford University Press, 1991.

9th-century patriarchs of Constantinople
9th-century births
901 deaths
Year of birth uncertain